Edwina Claire Bone (born 29 April 1988) is an Australian field hockey player. Her regular position is as a defender. Bone was a member of the Australia women's national field hockey team that were runners-up at the 2014 Women's Hockey World Cup. She was a member of the Australian team that defeated England in the women's field hockey final at the 2014 Commonwealth Games.

Edwina 'Eddie' Bone joined the Hockeyroos following two years in Hockey Australia's women's development program. She progressed through the junior ranks with the Canberra Strikers. Edwina established herself as a regular in the Hockeyroos' defense after a stellar 2014 season, claiming a gold medal at the Glasgow Commonwealth Games, and a silver medal at the World Cup and Champions Trophy. She also was part of the team that claimed 2nd place in the 2013 World League, as well as the team that won the 2013 Oceania Cup. She now has over 70 caps playing for Australia.

Bone qualified for the Tokyo 2020 Olympics. She was part of the Hockeyroos Olympics squad. The Hockeyroos lost 1-0 to India in the quarterfinals and therefore were not in medal contention.

Off the field, she studied a Bachelor of Sports Management at the University of Canberra. She hopes to become a sport coordinator or coach in the future.

References

External links
 
 
 
 

1988 births
Living people
Australian female field hockey players
Sportswomen from the Australian Capital Territory
Field hockey players at the 2014 Commonwealth Games
Commonwealth Games gold medallists for Australia
Field hockey players at the 2016 Summer Olympics
Olympic field hockey players of Australia
Commonwealth Games medallists in field hockey
ACT Academy of Sport alumni
Female field hockey defenders
Field hockey players at the 2020 Summer Olympics
20th-century Australian women
21st-century Australian women
Sportspeople from Canberra
Medallists at the 2014 Commonwealth Games